Stone Hits: The Very Best of Angie Stone is a greatest hits album by American R&B-soul singer-songwriter Angie Stone, released in the United States on June 21, 2005, by J Records. Stone's biggest UK hit, "Life Story", was offered as a bonus track.

Track listing

Notes
  signifies a co-producer
  signifies a programming producer
  signifies an additional producer and remixer
  signifies an associate producer

Sampling credits
 "Wish I Didn't Miss You" contains elements from "Back Stabbers" by The O'Jays.
 "I Wasn't Kidding" Contains a sample of Womack & Womack's "Baby I'm Scared of You".
 "I Wanna Thank Ya" contains re-sung lyrics from "Come into My Life" by Joyce Sims and interpolations of "All This Love" by DeBarge.
 "Lovers' Ghetto" contains elements from "Adventures in the Land of Music" by Dynasty.
 "Brotha Part II" contains excerpts from "I'll Play the Blues for You" by Albert King.
 "No More Rain (In This Cloud)" contains samples of "Neither One of Us (Wants to Be the First to Say Goodbye)" by Gladys Knight & the Pips.

Charts

Release history

References

2005 greatest hits albums
Albums produced by Craig Brockman
Albums produced by Jazze Pha
Albums produced by Missy Elliott
Albums produced by Raphael Saadiq
Albums produced by Swizz Beatz
Angie Stone albums
J Records compilation albums
Albums produced by Eddie F
Neo soul compilation albums
Contemporary R&B compilation albums
Soul compilation albums